is a retired Japanese professional shogi player ranked 9-dan. He is a former director of the Japanese Shogi Association.

Early life
Kobayashi was born in Takamatsu, Kagawa on March 31, 1957. He entered the Japan Shogi Association's apprentice school in 1972 at the rank of 6-kyū under the guidance of professional shogi player . At first, Kobayashi pursued his apprenticeship at the Japan Shogi Association's school in Tokyo; however, he soon began to have health problems, and moved to Nagoya to study under Itaya as a uchi-deshi (a live-in apprentice). He was promoted to the rank of apprentice professional 1-dan in 1974 and obtained full-professional status and the rank of 4-dan in December 1975.

Shogi professional
Kobayashi became the 40th professional to win his 600th official game when he defeated  in Meijin Class C1 tournament play on June 9, 2009.

In March 2018, Kobayashi finished the 76th Meijin Class C2 league (April 2017March 2018) with a record of 3 wins and 7 losses, earning a second consecutive demotion point which meant he was only one point away from automatic demotion to "Free Class" play. As a result, he declared his intention to the Japan Shogi Association to become a Free Class player as of April 2018 rather than risk automatic demotion.

Kobayashi retired from professional shogi on March 31, 2022. His career record was 699 wins and 774 loses.

Theoretical contributions
Together with Masataka Sugimoto he was well-known for systematizing Fourth File Rook josekis before the advent of the Fujii System, and also as the creator of the Super Fourth File Rook opening (スーパー四間飛車).

JSA director
Kobayashi served on the Japan Shogi Association's board of directors as a director from 1999 to 2004.

Promotion history
The promotion history for Kobayashi is as follows:
1972: 6-kyū
1974: 1-dan
1975, December 20: 4-dan
1979, April 1: 5-dan
1981, April 1: 6-dan
1983, April 1: 7-dan
1986, April 1: 8-dan
2002, March 1: 9-dan

Titles and other championships

Awards and honors
Kobayashi received the Japan Shogi Association's "Best New Player" (1980) and "Technique Award" (1990) Annual Shogi Awards. He also received the association's "25 Years Service Award" in 2000 for being an active professional for twenty-five years and the "Shogi Honor Award" in 2009 for winning 600 official games.

References

External links
 ShogiHub: Professional Player Info · Kobayashi, Kenji
 Kobayashi's school website: 小林健二九段将棋教室 

1957 births
Japanese shogi players
Living people
Professional shogi players
Retired professional shogi players
Professional shogi players from Kagawa Prefecture
People from Takamatsu, Kagawa